Legislative elections were held in Mexico on 7 July 1985. The Institutional Revolutionary Party won 292 of the 400 seats in the Chamber of Deputies. Voter turnout was 51-52%.

Results

References

Mexico
Legislative
Legislative elections in Mexico
July 1985 events in Mexico
Election and referendum articles with incomplete results